The 2004–05 FAW Premier Cup was the eighth season of the tournament since its founding in 1997.

First round

Second round

Quarter finals

Semi finals

Final

References

2004-05
2004–05 in Welsh football cups